Claes Hellgren (born 27 February 1955) is a Swedish former handball player who competed in the 1984 Summer Olympics and in the 1988 Summer Olympics.

References

1955 births
Living people
Swedish male handball players
Olympic handball players of Sweden
Handball players at the 1984 Summer Olympics
Handball players at the 1988 Summer Olympics
Hammarby Fotboll non-playing staff
20th-century Swedish people